Aminul Islam Mintu ( – 18 December 2020) was a Bangladeshi film editor.

Biography
In his career, he was awarded 4 times Bangladesh National Film Award for Best Editing for the film Aghat (1986), Opekkha (1987), Goriber Bou (1990), Ajante (1996).

Mintu died from COVID-19 on 19 December 2020, during the COVID-19 pandemic in Bangladesh.

Selected films

Awards and nominations
National Film Awards

References

External links
 

Bangladeshi editors
Best Editor National Film Award (Bangladesh) winners
2020 deaths
Year of birth missing
Deaths from the COVID-19 pandemic in Bangladesh
1930s births